Babette E. Babich (born 14 November 1956, in New York City) is an American philosopher who writes from a continental perspective on aesthetics, philosophy of science and technology in addition to critical and cultural theory.

Career 
Including research work at the Université Catholique de Louvain (Belgium), Université François-Rabelais, Tours (France), Freie Universität Berlin and Universität Tübingen (Germany) Babich has a doctoral degree from Boston College. She taught at Denison University and Marquette University before her current position at Fordham University in New York City in addition to an honorary appointment as Visiting Professor of Theology, Religion and Philosophy, University of Winchester, England. She has also taught, as visiting professor, most recently, at the Humboldt University, Berlin as well as at the Universität Tübingen, The University at Stony Brook (both Manhattan and Long Island Campuses), Georgetown University, the School of Visual Arts in Chelsea (NYC), University of California at San Diego, and the Juilliard School.

Work 
Babich writes on philosophy of technology and philosophy of science as well as philosophy of art, including philosophy of music, museum culture and poetics, film, television, and digital media, as well as life-size bronzes in antiquity (Greek sculpture), and the stylistic difference between analytic and continental philosophy.

Over the years, Babich has contributed to contemporary debates in philosophy of science as well as the history of science and sociology of philosophy and has written on ecology, especially aether (she is part of Aaron Michael Smith and Jordan Kokot's multimedia art project, field|guide) and animal philosophy. She specializes in the writings of Nietzsche, Heidegger, and Hölderlin and she engages the work of Theodor Adorno, Giorgio Agamben, Günther Anders, Paul Feyerabend, Bruno Latour, Georges Bataille, Jean Baudrillard, Ludwik Fleck, Ivan Illich, Paul Virilio, Peter Sloterdijk, and Slavoj Žižek.

Babich is the author of a range of studies foregrounding the role of politics in institutional philosophy, particularly the analytic-continental divide but also on the question of gender and agism. A student of Hans-Georg Gadamer and Jacques Taminiaux, she also worked with Jacob Taubes and Paul Feyerabend among others.

In 1995, she founded the journal New Nietzsche Studies, echoing the title of the 1974 book, The New Nietzsche, the continentally minded collection edited by David Blair Allison (1944-2016).

Bibliography

Books
 Günther Anders’ Philosophy of Technology: From Phenomenology to Critical Theory. London: Bloomsbury, 2022.
 Nietzsches Plastik. Ästhetische Phänomenologie im Spiegel des Lebens. London/Berlin: Peter Lang, 2021.
 Nietzsches Antike. Beiträge zur Altphilologie und Musik. Berlin: Academia, 2020.
 The Hallelujah Effect. Philosophical Reflections on Music, Performance Practice and Technology. Routledge: 2016. [2013]
 Un politique brisé. Le souci d'autrui, l'humanisme, et les juifs chez Heidegger. Paris: L'Harmattan, 2016.
 La fin de la pensée? Philosophie analytique contre philosophie continentale. Paris: L'Harmattan, 2012.
 Nietzsches Wissenschaftsphilosophie. »Die Wissenschaft unter der Optik des Künstlers zu sehn, die Kunst aber unter der des Lebens«. Oxford: Peter Lang, 2010. 
 "Eines Gottes Glück voller Macht und Liebe." Beiträge zu Nietzsche, Hölderlin, Heidegger. Weimar: Klassik Stiftung Weimar, Bauhaus-Universität Weimar, 2009.
 Words in Blood, Like Flowers: Philosophy and Poetry, Music and Eros in Hölderlin, Nietzsche, and Heidegger. Albany: State University of New York Press, 2006, paper: 2007.
 Nietzsche e la Scienza: Arte, vita, conoscenza. Translated by Fulvia Vimercati. Raffaello Cortina Editore. Milan. 1996.
 Nietzsche's Philosophy of Science: Reflecting Science on the Ground of Art and Life. State University of New York Press. Albany. 1994.

Edited collections
 Reading David Hume's 'Of the Standard of Taste. Berlin: de Gruyter, 2019.
 Hermeneutic Philosophies of Social Science. Berlin: de Gruyter, 2017.
 New Nietzsche Studies. [The Journal of the Nietzsche Society.] 1996 - ongoing.
 The Multidimensionality of Hermeneutic Phenomenology. Frankfurt am Main: Springer, 2013. [With Dimitri Ginev]
 Heidegger und Nietzsche. Amsterdam: Rodopi, 2012. [With Holger Zaborowski and Alfred Denker]
 Nietzsche, Habermas, and Critical Theory. Amherst, New York. Prometheus Books Humanity Books Imprint. 2004.
 Hermeneutic Philosophy of Science, Van Gogh's Eyes, and God: Essays in Honor of Patrick A. Heelan. S.J. [Boston Studies in the Philosophy of Science.] Dordrecht. Kluwer. 2002.
 Nietzsche, Theories of Knowledge and Critical Theory: Nietzsche and the Sciences I [Boston Studies in the Philosophy of Science.] Dordrecht. Kluwer. 1999.
 Nietzsche, Epistemology and Philosophy of Science: Nietzsche and the Sciences II [Boston Studies in the Philosophy of Science.] Dordrecht. Kluwer Academic Publishers. 1999.
 From Phenomenology to Thought, Errancy, and Desire: Essays in Honor of William J. Richardson, S.J. [Phænomenologica] Kluwer Academic Publishers. Dordrecht. 1995.

References

Further reading 
 "Between Impossible Wishes: An Interview with Babette Babich" by Nicholas Birns
 Inside Fordham "Professor sees Technology in Plato's cave". Interview by Janet Sassi. November 30, 2009''
 "A Philosophical Shock"

External links 
 Babette Babich: Fordham University Faculty Web Page

1956 births
20th-century American non-fiction writers
20th-century American philosophers
20th-century essayists
21st-century American non-fiction writers
21st-century American philosophers
21st-century essayists
American political philosophers
American social commentators
American sociologists
American women sociologists
American women essayists
American women philosophers
American women writers
Boston College alumni
Continental philosophers
Critical theorists
Environmental philosophers
Environmental writers
Epistemologists
Heidegger scholars
Historians of philosophy
Historians of science
Living people
Metaphysicians
Ontologists
Phenomenologists
Philosophers of art
Philosophers of culture
Philosophers of education
Philosophers of history
Philosophers of literature
Philosophers of religion
Philosophers of science
Philosophers of technology
Philosophy academics
Philosophy writers
Social philosophers
21st-century American women writers